Austrapoda seres is a species of moth of the family Limacodidae. It is found in China (Chekiang and Shaanxi) on an altitudes of 1,600 meters.

The wingspan is 24–27 mm. The forewings are elongate with a distinct tornus and a basal white patch.  There is a hooklike pattern on the forewings, with black proximal and paler (almost white) distal margins. The hindwings are pale brown. Adults have been recorded in June and July.

Etymology
The species name, seres refers to the ancient Greek and Roman name for the inhabitants of the north-western part of modern China.

References

External links 
 The Barcode of Life Data Systems (BOLD)

Limacodidae
Moths of Asia
Moths described in 2009